Andrew Parkinson (born 21 September 1967) is a former Australian former professional basketball player in the National Basketball League.

Known as "Parky", he played for the Geelong Supercats (1988–1990), Southern Melbourne Saints (1991, when he was included in the NBL All-Star Southern team), and the South East Melbourne Magic (1992–1998).

He won two NBL championships in 1992 & 1996 with the Magic. Other accolades include Most Improved Player in 1991 and Free Throw Percentage Leader in 1992.

Following his basketball career, Parkinson was a media personality, hosting an early incarnation of World Sport Overnight on SEN 1116 in early 2004 and working with South Dragons NBL basketball team during their short reign.
Parky plays in the Balwyn Championship league where his team were runners up to the Valhalla Vikings 37-40 who have been the dominate team in the league for many years.

References

1967 births
Living people
Australian men's basketball players
Geelong Supercats players
People educated at Melbourne High School
Shooting guards
Small forwards
South East Melbourne Magic players